High affinity cAMP-specific and IBMX-insensitive 3',5'-cyclic phosphodiesterase 8B is an enzyme that in humans is encoded by the PDE8B gene.

References

Further reading

PAS-domain-containing proteins